Let Me Be the First is the second album by Deborah Allen, released by RCA Records in 1984.

Track listing

Track information and credits taken from the album's liner notes.

Personnel
Deborah Allen - lead vocals
Eddie Bayers - drums, percussion
Tom Robb - bass
Brent Rowan - electric guitar
Steve Gibson - electric guitar, acoustic guitar
Bobby Wood - organ
John Jarvis - piano, keyboards
Rafe Van Hoy - acoustic guitar, synthesizer
Jim Horn - saxophone
Steve Nathan - synthesizer

Production
Producer: Rafe Van Hoy
Engineer: Chuck Ainlay
Mastered by: Hank Williams

References

External links
Deborah Allen Official Site
RCA Records Official Site

1984 albums
Deborah Allen albums
RCA Records albums